The men's 110 metres hurdles at the 2014 World Junior Championships in Athletics was held at Hayward Field from 22 to 24 July.

Medalists

Records
, the records were as follows:

Schedule

Results

Heats
Qualification: First 3 in each heat (Q) and the next 3 fastest (q) advanced to the semi-finals.

The heats commenced at 11:01 on 22 July. Wind: +0.1 m/s, +0.5 m/s, −0.2 m/s, −0.1 m/s, −0.3 m/s, +0.7 m/s, +0.6 m/s.

Semi-finals
Qualification: First 2 in each semi-final (Q) and the next 2 fastest (q) advanced to the final.

The semi-finals commenced at 17:32 on 23 July. Wind: -1.6 m/s, -0.3 m/s, −1.7 m/s.

Final
The final commenced at 19:33 on 24 July. Wind: +0.5 m/s.

References

External links
 110 metres hurdles schedule

110 metres hurdles
2014 in sports in Oregon
Sprint hurdles at the World Athletics U20 Championships